Lademoen is a neighborhood in the city of Trondheim in Trøndelag county, Norway. Lademoen was incorporated into the city of Trondheim in 1893.

The neighborhood is the site of Lademoen Church (Lademoen kirke).  The area is served by the Trøndelag Commuter Rail (Trønderbanen) with access at Lilleby Station. All buses east of town stop at Lademoen. Between 1893 and 1988 the Trondheim Tramway had a tram route from the city centre to Lademoen, which was expanded to Lade in 1958.

See also
Lademoen Station

References

Geography of Trondheim
Neighbourhoods of Trondheim